Psi Eridani, Latinized from ψ Eridani, is a star in the constellation Eridanus. With an apparent visual magnitude is 4.81, it can be seen with the naked eye on a clear, dark night. Based upon an annual parallax shift of 4.41 milliarcseconds, it is located roughly 740 light-years away from the Sun.

This is a B-type main-sequence star with a stellar classification of B3 V. However, Houk and Swift (1999) classed it as a more evolved subgiant star. It is about 32 million years old and has a projected rotational velocity of 52 km/s. The estimated mass is seven times that of the Sun, and it has around 4.5 times the Sun's radius. Psi Eridani shines with 2,878 times the solar luminosity from its outer atmosphere at an effective temperature of 18,700 K.

References

B-type main-sequence stars
Eridanus (constellation)
Eridani, Psi
Eridani, 65
032249
023364
01617
Durchmusterung objects